Zoroastrians are the oldest remaining religious community on the Iranian Plateau. Prior to the Muslim conquest of Iran, Zoroastrianism was the primary religion of Sassanid Iran.

According to the country's official census, there were 25,271 Zoroastrians in the country as of 2011, but some unofficial accounts suggest higher figures.

Background

There are no impartial written records from Zarathushtra's time. The earliest surviving written references to Zarathushtra (from non-Iranians) seem to be those of Greek writers. Zarathushtra and his first followers were Iranians that lived between the Bronze Age and Iron Age (est. 1200-600 BC).

The time of the Iranian peoples' migration to Iran can be mainly estimated through Assyrian records. Also, Herodotus (I, 101) recalled one of the Mede tribes to be called "Magoi", better known as "Magis", a tribe known to have included many priests, who served both Medes and Persians. By the time of the Median empire (est. 612 BC), Zoroastrianism is known to have been well established in both the Pars region (later capital of Persia) as well as in the Eastern regions.

Achaemenid dynasty

Persians led by Cyrus the Great soon established the second Iranian dynasty, and the first Persian empire by defeating the Medes dynasty in 549 BC. As Persians expanded their empire, Zoroastrianism was introduced to Greek historians such as Hermodorus, Hermippus, Xanthos, Eudoxus and Aristotle; each giving a different date regarding the life of Zoroaster but naturally believed him to be a Persian prophet and called him "Master of the magi"

Although there are no inscriptions left from the time of Cyrus about his religion, the fire-altars found at Pasargadae, as well as the fact that he called his daughter Atossa, name of the queen of Vishtaspa (Zoroaster's royal patron), suggests that he indeed may have been a Zoroastrian.

However, it is clear that by the time of Darius the Great (549 BC– 485/486 BC), the empire was clearly Zoroastrian. Darius declares in one of his inscriptions that:

Persepolis

Persepolis (or Parsa) was one of the four capitals of the Achaemenid empire, built by Darius the Great and his son Xerxes; it was a glorious city known to the world as the "richest city under the sun". It was also the trading capital of the Near East.

One of the main functions of Persepolis was to serve as the host of the ancient Zoroastrian festival, Norouz. Therefore, every year representatives from each country under the rule of Persia would bring gifts to Persepolis to show their loyalty to the king and the empire.

Arsacid dynasty

Sassanid dynasty

The Sassanid dynasty (224-651 AD) declared Zoroastrianism as the state religion and promoted a religious revival of Zoroastrianism.

During the period of their centuries long suzerainty over the Caucasus, the Sassanids made attempts to promote Zoroastrianism there with considerable successes, and it was prominent in the pre-Christian Caucasus (especially modern-day Azerbaijan).

Due to its ties to the Christian Roman Empire, Persia's arch-rival since Parthian times, the Sassanids were suspicious of Roman Christianity, and after the reign Constantine the Great sometimes persecuted it. The Sassanid authority clashed with their Armenian subjects in the Battle of Avarayr (451 CE), making them officially break with the Roman Church. But the Sassanids tolerated or even sometimes favored the Christianity of the Nestorian Church of Persia. The acceptance of Christianity in Georgia (Caucasian Iberia) saw the Zoroastrian religion there slowly but surely decline, but as late the 5th century AD it was still widely practised as something like a second established religion.

Prophet Mani

The prophet Mani was an Iranian of noble Parthian roots who established Manichaeism which contained many elements of Zoroastrianism as well as Gnosticism, however it saw the experience of life on earth by humans as miserable, which was a contrast to the Zoroastrian view which was to celebrate life through happiness.

Mani was received kindly by king Shapur I and spent many years at his court where he was protected during all of Shabuhr's reign. However Mani wrote in a semitic language (Syriac Aramaic), and all his work had to be translated into Middle Persian by his followers, who rendered the name of Mani's supreme god as Zurvan and called him the father of Ohrmazd (Ahuramazda, God of Wisdom, main deity of Zoroastrianism).

Zurvanism

Although the origins of Zurvanite Zoroastrianism are unclear, it was during the Sassanid period that it gained widespread acceptance, and many of the Sassanid emperors were at least to some extent Zurvanites. Zurvanism enjoyed royal sanction during the Sassanid era but no traces of it remain beyond the 10th century.

Unlike Mazdean Zoroastrianism, Zurvanism considered Ahura Mazda not the transcendental Creator, but one of two equal-but-opposite divinities under the supremacy of Zurvan. The central Zurvanite belief made Ahura Mazda (Middle Persian: Ohrmuzd) and Angra Mainyu (Ahriman) twin brothers that had co-existed for all time.

Non-Zoroastrian accounts of typically Zurvanite beliefs were the first traces of Zoroastrianism to reach the west, which misled European scholars to conclude that Zoroastrianism was a dualist faith.

The Zoroastrian cult of Zurvan should not be confused with the Manichaeism's use of the name Zurvan in Middle Persian texts to represent the Manichean deity of light. Mani had himself introduced this practice (for perhaps political reasons) in his Shapurgan, which he dedicated to his patron Shapur II. For much of the rest of the Sassanid era, the Manichaens were a persecuted minority, and Mani was sentenced to death by Bahram I.

Calendar reforms

Sacred fires

The three great sacred fires of Persia at the time of the Sassanids were the Adur Farnbag, Adur Gushnasp and the Adur Burzen-Mihr which burnt in Pars, Media and Parthia respectively. Of these three the Adur Burzen-Mihr was the most sacred fire as it was linked to the prophet Zarathustra himself and king Vishtaspa.

Mazdakite movement

Avesta

Middle Ages

Arab conquest and under the Caliphate

The Muslim conquest of Persia, also known as the Arab conquest of Iran led to the end of the Sasanian Empire in 651 and the eventual decline of the Zoroastrian religion in Iran. Arabs first attacked the Sassanid territory in 633, when general Khalid ibn Walid invaded Mesopotamia (what is now Iraq), which was the political and economic center of the Sassanid state. Following the transfer of Khalid to the Roman front in the Levant, the Muslims eventually lost their holdings to Iranian counterattacks. The second invasion began in 636 under Saad ibn Abi Waqqas, when a key victory at the Battle of Qadisiyyah led to the permanent end of Sasanian control west of Iran. The Zagros mountains then became a natural barrier and border between the Rashidun Caliphate and the Sassanid Empire. Owing to continuous raids by Persians into the area, Caliph Umar ordered a full invasion of the Sasanian Iranian empire in 642, which was completed with the complete conquest of the Sasanians around 651 The quick conquest of Iran in a series of well coordinated multi-pronged attacks, directed by Caliph Umar from Medina several thousand kilometres from the battlefields in Iran, became his greatest triumph, contributing to his reputation as a great military and political strategist.

Iranian historians have sought to defend their forebears by using Arab sources to illustrate that "contrary to the claims of some historians, Iranians, in fact, fought long and hard against the invading Arabs." By 651, most of the urban centers in Iranian lands, with the notable exception of the Caspian provinces and Transoxiana, had come under the domination of the Arab armies. Many localities in Iran staged a defense against the invaders, but in the end none was able to repulse the invasion. Even after the Arabs had subdued the country, many cities rose in rebellion, killing the Arab governor or attacking their garrisons, but reinforcements from the caliphs succeeded in putting down all these rebellions and imposing the rule of Islam. The violent subjugation of Bukhara after many uprisings is a case in point. Conversion to Islam was, however, only gradual. In the process, many acts of violence took place, Zoroastrian scriptures were burnt and many mobads executed. Once conquered politically, the Persians began to reassert themselves by maintaining Persian language and culture. Regardless, Islam was adopted by many, for political, socio-cultural or spiritual reasons, or simply by persuasion, and became the dominant religion.

Mongol rule
The Mongol invasion of Iran resulted in millions of deaths and ruined many cities. The early Mongol invaders were, however, pagans or Buddhists so their persecution was not as targeted against Zoroastrians as before. However, within half a century of the conquest, the leader of the Il-Khanate, Ghazan Khan, converted to Islam, which did not help the status of Zoroastrians in Iran. However, by the time that the Mongols were expelled, Pars province had escaped major damage and the Zoroastrians moved to the North of Pars mainly in the regions of Yazd and Kerman, where even today the main Zoroastrian communities are found.

Modern history

Safavid dynasty 
The Shiite Safavid dynasty destroyed what was once a vibrant community of Zoroastrians. As per official policy, Safavids wanted everyone to convert to the Shia sect of Islam and killed hundreds of thousands of Zoroastrians and other minorities when they refused.

The majority of Zoroastrians also left for India though about 20% remained, most of whom had to migrate in the late 19th century as the Qajar dynasty imposed greater restrictions on them.

Qajar dynasty 

During the Qajar dynasty, religious persecution of Zoroastrians was rampant. Due to the increasing contacts with influential Parsi philanthropists such as Maneckji Limji Hataria, many Zoroastrians left Iran for India. There, they formed the second major Indian Zoroastrian community known as the Iranis.

Pahlavi dynasty
Starting from the early twentieth century, Tehran, the nation's capital, experienced rapid migrations from all Iranian minorities. The Zoroastrian population increased from about 50 merchants in 1881 to 500 by 1912.

During the reign of the Pahlavi dynasty, Zoroastrians changed from being one of the most persecuted minorities in Iran to a symbol of Iranian nationalism.<ref name="janetamighi143">Janet Kestenberg Amighi "Zoroastrians of Iran, Conversion, Assimilation, or Persistence" pp. 143</ref> This notion carried on all the way through the 1979 Islamic Revolution when Ayatollah Sadughi proclaimed that "We Muslims are like the branches of a tree, if our roots are cut off, we shall shrivel up and die", also the last prime minister before the revolution Shapour Bakhtiar held an anti-Ayatollah Khomeini meeting in Los Angeles, California on the day of the Zoroastrian Mehregan festival (1980), in tribute to "true nationalism" (see Iranian nationalism)''.

Islamic Republic

Like the Armenian, Assyrian and Persian Jewish communities, Zoroastrians are officially recognized and on the grounds of the 1906 Constitution allocated one seat in the Iranian Parliament, currently held by Esfandiar Ekhtiari Kassnavieh. Out-marriage and low birth rates affect the growth of Iran's Zoroastrian population which, according to Iran's 2012 census results stood at 25,271, though this represented an increase of 27.5% on the 2006 population.

A June 2020 online survey found a much smaller percentage of Iranians stating they believe in Islam, with half of those surveyed indicating they had lost their religious faith. The poll, conducted by the Netherlands-based GAMAAN (Group for Analyzing and Measuring Attitudes in Iran), using online polling to provide greater anonymity for respondents, surveyed 50,000 Iranians and found 7.7% identified as Zoroastrians. However, some researchers have argued that most respondents identifying as Zoroastrian were expressing "Persian nationalism and a desire for an alternative to Islam, rather than strict adherence to the Zoroastrian faith".

In 2013, Sepanta Niknam was elected to the city council of Yazd and became the first Zoroastrian councillor in Iran.

Notable Iranian Zoroastrians in the 20th century:
 Rostam Giv.
 Jamshid Bahman Jamshidian, also known as Arbob Jamshid.
 Farhang Mehr.
 Keikhosrow Shahrokh, also known as Arbob Keikhoshrow.

See also

 Firooz Bahram Zoroastrian high school in Iran
 Persian people
 Religious minorities in Iran
 Zoroaster
 Sarv-e Abarkuh

References

Citations

Sources

Further reading
 Niechciał, P. (2015) "The Key Content of Contemporary Zoroastrian Identity in the Islamic Republic of Iran: a Socio-Anthropological Approach," in Krasnowolska, A. and Rusek-Kowalska, R. (eds) Studies on the Iranian World: Medieval and Modern. Jagiellonian University Press, pp. 149–156.
 Images of modern Zoroastrianism in Iran

 
Ethnic groups in Iran
Ethnic groups in the Middle East
History of Iran
Religion in Iran
Zoroastrianism by country